Acantholipes plumbeonitens is a species of moth in the family Erebidae. It is found in Angola.

References

Endemic fauna of Angola
plumbeonitens
Moths described in 1926
Moths of Africa